The Belle Fourche Dam, also known as Orman Dam, is a dam on Owl Creek in Butte County, South Dakota, USA, approximately eight miles east of Belle Fourche, South Dakota, along U.S. Route 212.  Its construction created the Belle Fourche Reservoir, the Belle Fourche National Wildlife Refuge, and the Rocky Point Recreation Area.

The reservoir has approximately eight thousand acres of water surface, 6700 acres of land, and 58 miles of shoreline.  It's stocked with walleye, catfish, and white bass.  Average depth is twenty-five feet, but it has areas as deep as sixty feet at full capacity.  Common activities at BFR include boating, fishing, ice fishing, ice skating, camping, cooking out, water skiing and fossil hunting.

Construction occurred in several stages between 1903 and 1907. The dam was the first project undertaken by the United States Bureau of Reclamation (USBR). At its 1911 completion by the USBR, Belle Fourche Dam was the largest earthen dam in the world.  The dam is listed on the National Register of Historic Places.  In 1989 it was listed among the approximately 250 Historic Civil Engineering Landmarks.

The dam is described as "a homogeneous earthfill structure containing about 1,783,000 cubic yards of material. It has a maximum base width of 650 feet, a structural height of 122 feet, and a hydraulic height of 97 feet. The crest of the dam at elevation 2989.75 has a length of 6,262 feet and a width of 19 feet."

References

External links 

 
 U.S. Bureau of Reclamation page
 

Dams on the National Register of Historic Places in South Dakota
Dams in South Dakota
Historic Civil Engineering Landmarks
Protected areas of Butte County, South Dakota
Reservoirs in South Dakota
United States Bureau of Reclamation dams
Dams completed in 1911
Bodies of water of Butte County, South Dakota
1911 establishments in South Dakota
National Register of Historic Places in Butte County, South Dakota